Mongolicosa is a genus of wolf spiders containing eight species found in central Asia from the Altai Mountains east to western Buryatia and south to Xinjiang and the Gobi Desert.

Spiders of this genus are dark coloured without any clear patterning. Body length is from 6 - 9.2 mm. The legs are relatively short compared with spiders of the related genera Acantholycosa and Sibirocosa.

Species
The genus Mongolicosa contains the following species:

Mongolicosa buryatica 
Mongolicosa glupovi 
Mongolicosa gobiensis 
Mongolicosa mongolensis 
Mongolicosa przhewalskii 
Mongolicosa pseudoferruginea 
Mongolicosa songi 
Mongolicosa uncia

References

Mongolicosa at Encyclopedia of Life

Lycosidae
Spiders of Asia
Araneomorphae genera